Eliška Mintálová (born 23 March 1999) is a Slovak slalom canoeist who has competed at the international level since 2016.

She won a bronze medal in the K1 team event at the 2021 World Championships in Bratislava. She also won a gold medal in the K1 event at the 2022 European Championships in Liptovský Mikuláš.

In July 2020 she won the women’s Slovak National Championship in the K1, winning by a 10 second margin.

On 8 May 2021 at the European Canoe Slalom Championships Mintálová finished 11th and secured her qualification for the delayed 2020 Tokyo Olympics. She finished in 9th place in the K1 event at the 2020 Summer Olympics.

World Cup individual podiums

References

External links

Living people
1999 births
Slovak female canoeists
Canoeists at the 2020 Summer Olympics
Olympic canoeists of Slovakia
Medalists at the ICF Canoe Slalom World Championships
Sportspeople from Žilina